A Juniperus chinensis, over 1500 years-old, is located near the Southeast University in Nanjing. It was planted by the Emperor Wu of Liang, the founder of the Liang dynasty during the Six Dynasties period, within the compound of the Liang imperial palace. Later, the palace was destroyed by war but the tree survives to this day.

During the Ming dynasty, the Guozijian was built in the same location. In the beginning of the 20th century, the Liang Jiang Normal Institute was situated here. It is now the location of the Southeast University.

See also
Nanjing

Individual conifers
Nanjing
Individual trees in China